Boveridge is a hamlet in Dorset, England about  north of Cranborne,  south-west of Salisbury, Wiltshire, and  north-east of Wimborne Minster, Dorset.

Notable buildings
Boveridge House, a grade II listed building was designed by William Evans of Wimborne and built some time after 1788 for Henry Brouncker. The Ordnance Survey surveyor's Drawing (1807-1808) shows the house set in a strip of pleasure grounds and woodland extending from north-west to south-east. There had been a farm on the site of an older mansion. In 1920, Charles Wilfred Gordon and his wife, an enthusiastic amateur gardener, commissioned Thomas Mawson to provide plans for new formal gardens around the house. Gertrude Jekyll provided planting plans which were implemented in the 1920s.
The house is adjacent to the mid-19th century Boveridge Farm which is also Grade II listed is north-west of the house.

In the 1890s the estate was sold to George Thursley and later sold again to Charles Gordon. It remained the property of the Gordon family until 1961 when it was bought by the Combe family of Cobham Park and then Viscount Cranborne, owner of nearby Cranborne Manor. The house and grounds were let to a special needs school and remain in school use. Renovation of the grounds took place from 1998.

Boveridge House School, also known as The Philip Green Memorial School currently occupied the site which is not open to the public, other than on special occasions. Students were admitted from the age of 11 for boarders. The school could accommodate up to 44 boarding students both male and female, with moderate to severe learning difficulties and communication problems. Students could be admitted from any Local Education Authority or private source.

Aurora Boveridge College, is currently an independent day and residential further education college at Boveridge House. It supports young people who may have a diagnosis of Autism, anxiety, social and emotional or mental health needs. They admit students ages 16 - 25 In flexible placements. The college is a part of the larger Aurora group. In the grounds, there is also a 14 - 16-year-old school called The Beeches.

The former St Aldhelm's Church was built in 1838 as a chapel of ease to the Church of St Mary and St Bartholomew in Cranborne. It is now a private residence.

References

External links

Hamlets in Dorset